Under Control may refer to:

 Under Control (album), a 2010 album by Cary Brothers
 "Under Control" (Calvin Harris and Alesso song), 2013
 Under Control (film), a 1999 Hong Kong film starring Jackie Chan, originally released under the title Gorgeous
 "Under Control" (Parachute song), 2009
 "Under Control" (The Vampire Diaries), a 2010 episode of the television series The Vampire Diaries
 "Under Control", a song by Ellie Goulding from the album Halcyon Days
 "Under Control", a song by The Internet from the album Ego Death
 "Under Control", a song by Plastiscines from the album LP1
 "Under Control", a song by Rage from the album End of All Days
 "Under Control", a song by The Strokes from the album Room on Fire
 "Under Control", a song by Tom Pearman